Salma Mumin is a Ghanaian actress and producer. Her contributions to the Ghanaian movie industry have earned her several accolades, including Best International New Actress at the 2014 Papyrus Magazine Screen Actors Awards and Best Actress in a Leading Role at the 2019 Ghana Movie Awards.

Early life
She later moved to Accra to pursue her acting career.

Career
Mumin made her screen debut in 2007 where she was featured in the movie Passion and Soul. Since 2012 she has also played roles in the movies Seduction, No Apology, College Girls, Leave my wife, The Will, No Man’s Land, and What My Wife Doesn’t Know, and John and John.  Her first screen performance were in I Love Your Husband 1, 2, and 3 in 2009. She also starred in the film You May Kill the Bride in 2016. She has also been on international movies.

Producer
In 2015, she produced her first movie titled No Man's Land.

Promotional work
Mumin's face can be seen on billboards and TV commercials in Ghana, including commercials for UniBank, Jumbo, Electromart and many more. Her first TV commercial was for UniBank. She is the brand ambassador for Hollywood Nutritions Slim Smart.

Filmography

What My Wife Doesn’t Know
No Man’s Land 
Seduction
No Apology
Passion and Soul
College Girls
Leave My Wife
The Will
Amakye and Dede
John and John
Apples and Bananas

References

External links
 

Living people
21st-century Ghanaian actresses
Ghanaian film actresses
Year of birth missing (living people)